Jerryy is a Nepali romantic drama movie directed by Hem Raj BC. featuring Anmol K.C. and Anna Sharma in the lead roles. The film revolves around Jaiveer "Jerryy" Rana (Anmol K.C.) who loves to live an adventurous life, and the trials and tribulation that he suffers during his life and love life with Akansha.

The film was praised for the direction of Hemraj BC, its screenplay, and the performance of Anna Sharma. Critics consider it Anmol K.C.'s best performance. The film was a huge blockbuster at the box office and established Anmol K.C. as a leading actor in Nepali cinema.

Plot

Jaiveer "Jerryy" Rana is a casanova and defines love as like a no-warranty mobile, but his definition fails when he meets the adorable Akanshya (Anna Sharma) on a trip to Mustang. Akanshya loves photography. This film is all about the journey of love between Jerryy and Akanshya which ends sadly with the death of Jerryy.

Cast
Anmol K.C. as Jaiveer Rana, "Jerryy"
Anna Sharma as Akanshya
Amaliya Sharma
Gaurav Pahadi
Abhishek Man Sherchan
Yash RJB

Awards and nominations

Reception

The film earned about 84.72 lakhs gross in three days. Jerryy earned 2.8 crore in its lifetime and was one of the few films of the year to achieve this.

References

External links

2010s Nepali-language films
2014 films
2014 romantic drama films
Nepalese romantic drama films
Films shot in Pokhara